The 1968 United States presidential election in Montana took place on November 5, 1968, and was part of the 1968 United States presidential election. Voters chose four representatives, or electors to the Electoral College, who voted for president and vice president.

Montana voted for the Republican nominee, former Vice President Richard Nixon, over the Democratic nominee, Vice President Hubert Humphrey. Nixon won Montana by a large margin of 9.01%. A third-party candidate, former Alabama Governor George Wallace, won 7.29% of the vote, or 20,015 raw votes, the highest percentage for a 3rd party candidate in the state since Robert M. La Follette in 1924, and would not be surpassed or equaled until Independent John B. Anderson in 1980, who went on to receive 8.05% of the vote, or 29,281 raw votes. Wallace was most successful in the mountain regions, which have a tradition of hostility to Washington D.C. interference, and also to Northeastern big business. Wallace possessed little appeal in heavily German and Scandinavian Plains regions.

Nixon's victory was the first of six consecutive Republican victories in the state, as Montana would not vote for a Democratic candidate again until Bill Clinton in 1992. However, Montana would return to being a safe Republican state afterwards.

, this remains the last occasion the Democratic presidential nominee has carried Jefferson County, where Humphrey won a 22-vote plurality.

Results

Results by county

See also
 United States presidential elections in Montana

Notes

References

Montana
1968
1968 Montana elections